USNS Sands (T-AGOR-6) was a  operated by the Military Sealift Command (MSC) for the Naval Oceanographic Office from 1965 to 1973. During that period she provided ocean-bottom information and underwater test data to the U.S. Navy and other U.S. agencies. The ship was the second naval vessel to be named for Rear Admiral Benjamin F. Sands and his son Rear Admiral James H. Sands, the first being the destroyer . The ship operated in the Atlantic on oceanographic and geophysical assignments for the Oceanographic Office and other agencies.

In 1974 the ship was leased to Brazil, renamed Almirante Camara and in 1990 Brazil purchased the ship under the Security Assistance Program. Almirante Camara was engaged in oceanographic work for Brazil in the South Atlantic until retirement in 2003.

Construction
Sands was laid down on 23 August 1962 by the Marietta Manufacturing Co. of Point Pleasant, West Virginia as hull number 911, the first of three such vessels built for the United States Navy by the builder.  The ship was launched on 14 September 1963; sponsored by Miss Priscilla G. Sands; and accepted by the Navy and placed in service with the then Military Sea Transportation Service (MSTS) on 2 February 1965, Capt. George W. Fladerer, Master.

Naval Oceanographic Office service
Manned by a Civil Service crew, the United States Naval Ship Sands was operated in the Atlantic Ocean by the Military Sealift Command (formerly MSTS) for the Naval Oceanographic Office. The ship was operated by that office as one of the "Navy Pool" vessels for which the office coordinated use by Navy laboratories, universities and research organizations with Navy contracts for varied projects.

Until being placed out of service, in reserve, in April 1973, Sands performed oceanographic and marine geophysical research and conducted experiments in underwater sound propagation. For example, in the early 1970s Sands planted large vertical subsurface acoustic arrays in the tropical Atlantic. These arrays were unique for having long term recording capabilities enabling months' long acoustic data to be collected; and for the first use of the then new material Kevlar as the strength member of the arrays. Kevlar, created by DuPont for use as cords in vehicular tires, was found to have stretch characteristics that matched those of the conductive copper wires embedded in an array. (Whereas a material like dacron can stretch upwards 50% before breaking, kevlar limits stretch to 2% before failure. This greatly reduced longitudinal stresses on the copper wires and permitted precise vertical positioning of hydrophones in the vertical string.) Sands, during this period, also conducted acoustic data collection voyages in the area around Malta and the lower Adriatic Sea.

Sands was placed out of service in 1973.

Transfer to Brazil 
On 1 July 1974 the ship was leased by Brazil, renamed Almirante Camara, after a major supporter of  Brazilian hydrography, Admiral Antônio Alves Câmara Junior, and placed in service under the command of Captain-de-frigate Fernando Carlos Catta Preta Baumeir. In 1990 an agreement was signed for purchase of the ship by Brazil at the end of the lease. The purchase was effective under the Security Assistance Program 5 December 1990.

Almirante Camara decommissioned 7 August 2003 at a ceremony at the Naval Base, Rio de Janeiro and sold at auction in 2004.

Footnotes

References

External links
  NavSource Online: Service Ship Photo Archive USNS Sands (T-AGOR-6)
 NOc Almirante Câmara - H 41 (Ship history, in Portuguese, with photos.)

 

Robert D. Conrad-class oceanographic research ships
Research vessels of the United States Navy
Ships built in Point Pleasant, West Virginia
1963 ships
Ships transferred from the United States Navy to the Brazilian Navy
Auxiliary ships of the Brazilian Navy